In mathematics, the simplicial approximation theorem is a foundational result for algebraic topology, guaranteeing that continuous mappings can be (by a slight deformation) approximated by ones that are piecewise of the simplest kind. It applies to mappings between spaces that are built up from simplices—that is, finite simplicial complexes. The general continuous mapping between such spaces can be represented approximately by the type of mapping that is (affine-) linear on each simplex into another simplex, at the cost (i) of sufficient barycentric subdivision of the simplices of the domain, and (ii) replacement of the actual mapping by a homotopic one.

This theorem was first proved by L.E.J. Brouwer, by use of the Lebesgue covering theorem (a result based on compactness). It served to put the homology theory of the time—the first decade of the twentieth century—on a rigorous basis, since it showed that the topological effect (on homology groups) of continuous mappings could in a given case be expressed in a finitary way. This must be seen against the background of a realisation at the time that continuity was in general compatible with the pathological, in some other areas. This initiated, one could say, the era of combinatorial topology.

There is a further simplicial approximation theorem for homotopies, stating that a homotopy between continuous mappings can likewise be approximated by a combinatorial version.

Formal statement of the theorem

Let  and  be two simplicial complexes. A simplicial mapping  is called a simplicial approximation of a continuous function  if for every point ,  belongs to the minimal closed simplex of  containing the point .

References

Theory of continuous functions
Simplicial sets
Theorems in algebraic topology